Baromi is a locality in Victoria, Australia.

Demographics
The median age of persons in Baromi was 37 years. There were more males than females, with 52.3% of the population male and 47.7% female. The average household size was 2.5 people per household.

References

Towns in Victoria (Australia)
Shire of South Gippsland